Kamalakur is located in Kadapa district, Andhra Pradesh, India  about 10 km  from Badvel.

Villages in Kadapa district